The Jeolgang Pyeon clan is one of the Bon-gwan or clans of Korea originating in Zhejiang, China. According to research conducted in 2000, the number of Jeolgang Pyeon clan’s members was 10,678.

Origin 
He sent troops to Joseon as the Area Commander during the Japanese invasions in the late 16th century, but he was not able to come back to his country due to a betrayal. He was naturalized in Joseon. After his three sons heard the news, they went to Joseon, and settled in Naju, Jeolla Province.

See also 
 Korean clan names of foreign origin
 Haeju Seok clan

References

External links 
 

 
Korean clan names of Chinese origin
Pyeon clans